Paul Amoako Acquah is a Ghanaian economist and a former Deputy Director for the Africa Department of the International Monetary Fund from 1998 to 2001. He is also a former Governor of the Bank of Ghana (2001-2009). During his tenure as Governor of the Bank of Ghana he implemented the re-denomination of the Ghanaian cedi.

Early life and education
He was born in Juabo in the Western Region of Ghana. Acquah had his secondary education at St. Augustine's College. He later obtained his degree in Economics from the University of Ghana, Legon. He proceeded to obtain his master's degree from Yale University and his PhD from University of Pennsylvania.

Career
Acquah joined the International Monetary Fund as an economist. He worked for the fund and served in various capacities till 1998 when he became the fund's deputy director of its Africa department. In 2001 he resigned from the IMF and was appointed by the then President of Ghana, John Kufuor as the Governor of the Bank of Ghana until 2009.

Acquah became Governor of the Bank of Ghana in 2001. One of his major achievement was the re-denomination of the cedi and the introduction of the Pesewa in 2007. Four zeros were knocked off the then currency, this led to the reintroduction of the pesewa which is the basic unit of the Ghanaian cedi.

After leaving the Bank of Ghana, Paul Acquah joined a new team setup to oversee the restructuring and development of Tema Oil Refinery and Ghana's crude oil supply. Other team members were Kwabena Duffuor, Chief of Staff John Henry Martey Newman, and Minister of Energy Joe Oteng-Adjei.

Awards
In 2005, Acquah won the Emerging Markets award for Africa Central Bank Governor of the Year.

References

Governors of Bank of Ghana
20th-century Ghanaian economists
Living people
Yale University alumni
University of Pennsylvania alumni
Year of birth missing (living people)
St. Augustine's College (Cape Coast) alumni
Fante people
21st-century Ghanaian economists